Ruqayya is an Arabic female given name meaning "to rise”,”she who rises high”.

It is not to be confused with a separate Arabic term "Ruqia" from Arabic رقى (ruqia) meaning “to rise” or “ascend.”

Ruqayya bint Muhammad was the daughter of the Islamic prophet Muhammad and wife of third Rashidun caliph Uthman. 

Other notable people with the name include:

 Ruqayya bint Ali, daughter of Ali (cousin of Muhammad)
 Ruqayya bint Husayn, daughter of Husayn (grandson of Muhammad)
 Empress Ruqaiya Sultan Begum, first wife and chief consort of the Mughal Emperor Akbar
 Ruqaya Al-Ghasra, a Bahraini athlete. She was one of the first women to represent Bahrain at the Olympic Games
 Ruqayyah Ahmed Rufa'i, Nigerian Minister of Education
 Ruqaiyyah Waris Maqsood, British Muslim author and winner of the Global Peace and Unity Lifetime Achievement Award for literature
 Ruqayyah Boyer, a Dutch-Guyanese model and Miss Guyana Universe
 Ruqaiya Hasan, a professor of linguistics

See also
Arabic name
List of peoples
List of adjectival forms of place names
Most popular given names

References

Arabic feminine given names
Given names